Dorcadion danilevskyi is a species of beetle in the family Cerambycidae. It was described by Dolin and Ovtschinikov in 1999. It is known from Central Asia.

See also 
 Dorcadion

References

danilevskyi
Beetles described in 1999